Yukhnovsky District is an administrative and municipal district (raion), one of the twenty-four in Kaluga Oblast, Russia. It is located in the northwest of the oblast. Its administrative center is the town of Yukhnov. Population:  14,447 (2002 Census);  The population of Yukhnov accounts for 51.2% of the district's total population.

References

Notes

Sources

Districts of Kaluga Oblast